Je n'ai que mon âme is a compilation album released only in Quebec by Canadian singer Natasha St-Pier. The album was released due to the success of the song Je n'ai que mon âme in Canada, as its parent album A chacun son histoire had not been released in Canada. Also an English version of Je n'ai que mon âme was included (it is called All I Have Is My Soul).  The album contains one unreleased song, I'm in Love, which is an English version of Tu m'envoles and has never been released in France. The album was released on 26 June 2001. No singles were released from this album.

Track listing 

 Je n'ai que mon âme (2:51)
 Sans le savoir (4:40)
 Il ne sait pas (4:07)
 J'ai cru trouver l'amour (3:10)
 Repose ton âme (4:54)
 My Heart If You Will Swear (2:25)
 Je t'aime encore (dance version) (3:51)
 I'm in love (4:18)
 Le vent (4:22)
 Près d'une autre (5:29)
 All I Have Is My Soul (2:51)

Certifications

References
 

2001 compilation albums
Natasha St-Pier albums
Sony Music France albums